Junkyard is an American hard rock band formed in 1987 in Los Angeles, with members previously in Minor Threat, Big Boys, Decry and Dag Nasty. The band drew comparisons with Guns N' Roses (which, like Junkyard, signed with Geffen Records).

In 2017, the band released its first album since 1991, High Water.

History

Origins 
The original line-up of the band included several members who were not a part of the group by the time they began recording. Max Gottlieb was the original guitarist and songwriter, and the original drummer was Johnny Hell and skateboarder Tony Alva was also briefly in the band. After these two left the group, the lineup stabilized around lead singer David Roach, guitarist Chris Gates, bassist Clay Anthony and drummer Patrick Muzingo. Brian Baker (guitar, ex-Dag Nasty/Minor Threat), joined the band just prior to the recording of the first album. Although the band was heavily influenced by Southern rock, Baker had told Sounds, "I hate the concept. I like that music, but I'm not into the rebel flag or the throwing up in your pickup truck."

The band was signed by Geffen Records in January 1988, with a self-titled Tom Werman-produced debut album issued in 1989, described by Allmusic as incorporating "elements of Southern rock, boogie-woogie, and AC/DCism into one compact sound."  The album featured singles "Hollywood" and "Simple Man." This album was followed two years later by Sixes, Sevens & Nines, produced by Ed Stasium and featuring contributions from Steve Earle. Anthony left the band shortly before the release of the second album amid drug problems, to be replaced by Todd Muscat (brother of Faster Pussycat guitarist Brent Muscat). The band was dropped by Geffen in 1992, with a third album recorded but not released, and disbanded shortly afterwards. The unreleased third album was subsequently issued as XXX and The Joker.

Post-breakup/reformation 

Roach founded Borracho with members of Promise and Dogs D'Amour, while Gates formed 99 lbs. Muzingo formed Catfish and later Battery Club. Baker, who had already become a veteran of the punk rock scene prior to joining Junkyard, went on to join Bad Religion.

A live Junkyard album was issued in 2000, and Baker, Roach, Muzingo and Muscat reformed the band, with Tim Mosher (guitar/vocals) added to the line-up. A tour of Japan followed, with Dogs D'Amour guitarist Jo Dog added to the line-up for these dates. The new line-up recorded the 2003 mini-album Tried and True, comprising a mixture of old and new songs.

Since 2000, the band has toured Europe twice, co-headlined the Serie Z festival (in the south of Spain) with acts that were very complimentary of the way the band should have been marketed (other bands on the festival were The Hellacopters, The Quireboys, The Wildhearts, Radio Birdman, Georgia Satellites, Michelle Gun Elephant, Nine Pound Hammer and Reverend Horton Heat). and have played a handful of shows domestically in Austin, Tulsa, Los Angeles to name a few.

In 2008, the band released an album of previously unreleased material, originally recorded for a 1987 demo that helped get them signed to Geffen. The album is titled Put it on Ten and Pull the Knobs Off!.

On July 10, 2015, Junkyard released two brand-new songs, "Faded" b/w The River", on Unison Music Group, with a CD single and 7" vinyl following in late August.

On April 21, 2017, the band's first studio album in 26 years, High Water, on Acetate Records.

On November 22, 2019, Junkyard released a studio album recorded in 1992, Old Habits Die Hard.

On September 10, 2021, Junkyard released another new single, "Lifer", b/w "Last of a Dying Breed".

Side projects 
Outside of Junkyard, members of the band remain actively involved in individual projects: Gates with his solo outfit "Chris Gates and Gatesville," based out of Austin (Gates on Gatesville: "Once it got to be time to put a band together, fate and a bunch of mutual friends sent guitar wiz Tony Redman my way. Our first meeting was where Gatesville really began. The more we play together, the more we push each other and the music to see just what we can wring out of'er. The band went through a couple of line-up changes until we found Scott Womack on bass and Paul Soliz on drums. Once this line-up came together the band and the music took on a life of its own."); Baker with Bad Religion and Mosher with his outfit, The Light Brigade.

Members

Current 
 David Roach – lead vocals (1987–1992; 2000–present)
 Patrick Muzingo – drums (1987–1992; 2000–present)
 Todd Muscat – bass guitar (1991–1992; 2000–present)
 Tim Mosher – guitar (2000–present)
 Jimmy James – guitar (2017–present)

Former 
 Max Gottlieb – lead guitar (1987)
 Clay Anthony – bass guitar (1987–1991) (died 2020)
 Johnny Hell – drums (1987)
 Chris Gates – guitar (1987–2009)
 Brian Baker – lead guitar (1989–1992; 2006–2017)

Discography

Albums

Singles

See also 
List of glam metal bands and artists

References

External links 
Junkyard's official website

Junkyard at sleazeroxx

Glam metal musical groups from California
Hard rock musical groups from California
Musical groups established in 1987